Coptodisca ella is a moth of the family Heliozelidae. It was described by Vactor Tousey Chambers in 1871. It is found in North America, including Tennessee.

The larvae feed on Carya species. They mine the leaves of their host plant.

References

Moths described in 1871
Heliozelidae